Mezire may refer to:
 Məzirə, Azerbaijan
 Méziré, France